Shanghai Surprise is a 1986 adventure comedy film directed by Jim Goddard and starring then-newlyweds Sean Penn and Madonna. The screenplay was adapted by John Kohn and Robert Bentley from Tony Kenrick's 1978 novel Faraday's Flowers.

Produced by George Harrison's HandMade Films and distributed by Metro-Goldwyn-Mayer, Harrison himself appeared as a night club singer, and recorded several songs for the soundtrack, including "Breath Away from Heaven", which was re-recorded and released on his 1987 album Cloud Nine along with "Someplace Else", also used in the film. The soundtrack was never officially released, and was only briefly available as a promotional single featuring the title track, coupled with "Zig Zag". Both of these songs have since been released as "additional tracks" on the 2004 Cloud Nine re-release. Another track, "The Hottest Gong in Town", was included on the EP Songs by George Harrison Volume 2.

Shanghai Surprise was a critical and commercial failure.

Plot summary
Glendon Wasey is a sleazy, down-on-his-luck con man struggling to sell glow-in-the-dark neckties in Shanghai. When he encounters the lovely Gloria Tatlock, a missionary nurse who wants to obtain a supply of opium to ease the suffering of her patients, he decides to help her get hold of a stolen supply of the valuable drug. The only problem is that a lot of other people want to secure the stolen opium as well—gangsters, smugglers, thugs and a host of upstanding air force recruits.

Cast
 Sean Penn as Glendon Wasey
 Madonna as Gloria Tatlock
 Paul Freeman as Walter Faraday
 Richard Griffiths as Willie Tuttle
 Philip Sayer as Justin Kronk
 Clyde Kusatsu as Joe Go
 George Harrison as Night Club Singer
 Victor Wong as Ho Chong
 Lim Kay Tong as Mei Gan

Marketing
The Atlanta Journal-Constitution reported in October, 1986, "The movie opened so poorly in its first wave of playdates (late August in the Northeast and Midwest) that MGM has made severe cuts in its marketing budget. One MGM exec was quoted in the trades as saying this was necessary because 'the interest in the film has been non-existent.'"

Critical reception
An overwhelming number of critics panned Shanghai Surprise.  Bill Cosford of The Miami Herald, granting it 1 star out of 4, wrote, "In Shanghai Surprise, as you may have heard, almost everything is just a bit off. Though widely anticipated as a musical, Shanghai Surprise is actually a kind of miniaturization of Raiders of the Lost Ark / Indiana Jones and the Temple of Doom, with a feisty heroine (Madonna) in the vain [sic] of Rita Hayworth in The Lady From Shanghai, and a roguish adventure hero (Sean Penn) as well as a pop-sprinkled score (partly the work of George Harrison)... There's a plot here, involving Madonna's quest to find a load of hijacked opium for conversion to morphine to help the troops fighting the Japanese. Penn, though he spends his big scene panting in a brothel, will save the day. But the film was conceived and executed as a star vehicle. Wrong stars, wrong roles, not much happening here. And for George Harrison and his Handmade Films, the first big bust."

The Philadelphia Inquirer also gave it only 1 star: "Shanghai Surprise is so dismally scripted and directed that no one could redeem it... an atmospheric, handsomely shot and, sadly, utterly empty piece of work." The Lexington Herald-Leader called it "a turkey": "This film is bad. The acting is terrible. The hackneyed screenplay traffics in stereotype and yuk-yuk jokes. And the point is non-existent."  The San Diego Union said, "In its campy nostalgia for old adventure films, Shanghai Surprise is cloddish. There's something rotten at the core about a movie that would recycle lines like "That's mighty white of you." Even sadder is the realization that some of the old cornball movies are still fresher, more alive, than this regurgitation."

The Philadelphia Daily News faulted the casting as well as the script: "The ever-important spirit is missing as Mr. and Mrs. Penn wrestle with old gags that are beyond their ken. It's not entirely their fault though: They've been given no characters to play. Much of Shanghai Surprise might have worked if they at least were permitted to play themselves — a punk rocker and punk actor at large in an alien movie world."  The Chicago Sun-Times, awarding the movie half a star, complained of its "warped attitudes toward women," adding, "It's hard to know for whom this wretch of a film was made. Idiotic dialogue should turn off the adults, teens will be disappointed by their rock heroine and kids shouldn't even be watching." Film professor Michal Conford, of Ryerson University, reviewed the film for the San Jose Mercury News with another half-star rating, saying sardonically, "Shanghai Surprise stars Madonna and Sean Penn together for the first time and has songs by George Harrison. That is the most positive sentence that can be written about the film, now playing locally. MGM must have suspected – the company tried to open the film in places like Iowa to avoid getting slaughtered. Nice try... The film is supposed to be a shaggy dog adventure... Shaggy, no. Dog, yes."

Shanghai Surprise currently holds a 20% rating on Rotten Tomatoes based on 10 reviews.

Awards and nominations
 7th Golden Raspberry Awards  
 Won: Worst Actress - Madonna
 Nominated: Worst Picture
 Nominated: Worst Director - Jim Goddard
 Nominated: Worst Screenplay - John Kohn and Robert Bentley
 Nominated: Worst Original Song - "Shanghai Surprise"
 Nominated: Worst Actor - Sean Penn
 Stinkers Bad Movie Awards  
 Nominated: Worst Picture

See also
 Gigli

References

Further reading

External links

 
 
 

1986 films
1980s adventure comedy films
1986 romantic comedy films
British adventure comedy films
British romantic comedy films
Films set in 1937
Films set in 1938
Films set in Shanghai
HandMade Films films
Metro-Goldwyn-Mayer films
Films directed by Jim Goddard
Second Sino-Japanese War films
Films scored by Michael Kamen
Films scored by George Harrison
Golden Raspberry Award winning films
1980s English-language films
1980s British films